The Eneos Sunflowers are a basketball team based in Kashiwa, Chiba, playing in the Women's Japan Basketball League.

Notable players
Clarissa Davis
Manami Fujioka
Mikiko Hagiwara
Saki Hayashi
Hiromi Kawabata
Noriko Koiso
Mari Konno
Kaori Kusuda
Yuka Mamiya
Katrina McClain Johnson
Yuki Miyazawa
Yuko Oga
Taeko Oyama
Masami Tachikawa
Ramu Tokashiki
Ryoko Yano
Asami Yoshida (basketball)

Head coaches
Kazuo Nakamura (basketball)
Tomohide Utsumi
Kiyomi Sato
Tom Hovasse
Eiki Umezaki

References

External links
Official website

Basketball teams in Japan
Basketball teams established in 1969
1969 establishments in Japan